Ogwho Evwri (also called owho soup by non indigenes is a soup  of the Urhobo people of southern Nigeria.  

The soup is made with garri soaked in water after  palm oil and potash mixture has been added. It is served at almost all gatherings of the Urhobo people. 

Oghwo Evwri is often times served with Usi & sometimes garri.

Origin
Oghwo Evwri is a soup of the Urhobo people of southern Nigeria.   The soup is made with garri soaked in water after palm oil and potash mixture has been added.

Preparation
Owho soup is made from fish, Banga oil, beef, crayfish, palm oil, potash where garri is poured into palm oil thickened with potash. Sometimes it is made with other ingredients such as bush meat. The garri is blended initially to smoothen it, adding other ingredients like cray fish the soup is ready when there's floating oil on it.

Serving
Oghwo Evwri is traditionally served  with Usi (starch) and other times, Garri (Eba).

The soup is a regular home delicacy to Ihwo r’ Urhobo and it is also a signature plate at Urhobo Parties. It’s absence at an Urhobo party is often times considered insulting to guests. 

Oghwo Evwri can also serve as a sauce to plantain & yam.

See also 
Urhobo people
Palm nut soup
Ukodo
Banga rice

References

Nigerian soups
Wedding food